Anolis crassulus, the ornate anole, is a species of lizard in the family Dactyloidae. The species is found in Guatemala, El Salvador, and Mexico.

References

Anoles
Reptiles of Guatemala
Reptiles of El Salvador
Reptiles of Mexico
Reptiles described in 1864
Taxa named by Edward Drinker Cope